Myers Park is a narrow park in central Auckland, New Zealand, running parallel to the upper part of Queen Street. It is characterised by steep, grassed slopes and canopied with a mixture of large exotic and native trees, including an alley of large palm trees.

A playground, benches, and various artworks (including a marble copy of Michelangelo's sitting Moses statue) are features of the park. Paths cross the park connecting to Queen Street, K Road, Grey's Avenue and Aotea Square.

Opened in 1915 Myers Park is sometimes referred to as Auckland's oldest park, which is incorrect as several parks predate it: the Auckland Domain (1842), Western Park (1875), Albert Park (1884), Victoria Park (1905), Point Erin Park (1911) and Parnell Park (1913) (now Dove-Myer Robinson Park).

History
Running downhill from the northern slope of the Karangahape ridge, the park was formed in 1914-15 out of an overgrown gully facing towards the Waitematā Harbour.

The gully was the start of the Waihorotiu Stream, also known as the 'Queen Street River'. As it followed the route of Queen Street below Victoria Street the open stream became polluted, its lower reaches being little more than an open sewer. Several modifications were made; in the 1870s the City Engineer Mr Ligar tried to stabilise the crumbling earth banks by creating wooden barrier walls resulting in it being referred to as the "Ligar Canal".

In the 1880s it was bricked over as part of the emerging storm-water and sewerage system. It is now completely underground but still discharges into the harbour beneath the Ferry Building at the bottom of Queen Street. The last portions of the stream to be put underground were the lower part of what is now Myers Park in 1908 and the upper reaches in 1914 when the park was created.

The City Beautiful 

During his time as Mayor, Christopher Parr advocated many projects to enhance the urban environment of Auckland: this was inline with many similar overseas schemes, often using the term "The City Beautiful".

Parr's mayoralty saw the establishment of many of Auckland's parks, such as Point Erin Park, Parnell Park (now Dove-Myer Robinson Park), and much land in the Waitākere Ranges. It was during this spate of development that Myers Park was founded. 
In 1913, the area of the gully was described as consisting of "slum shanties and rubbish tips", creating the popular impression that this was an example of slum clearance. In fact the area was actually comparatively empty of buildings, only 14 buildings were standing on eight acres of land and 12 of those were very tiny cottages. The site was ideal simply because there were so few buildings to clear from the site, all of which were sold for relocation by the City Council Works Department.

The park came about largely because of Arthur Mielzinier Myers MP who had been mayor of Auckland from 1905 - 1909.  Myers had been responsible for a number of civic improvements during his time as mayor including Grafton Bridge and the Auckland Town Hall. He initiated a number of these projects himself or championed the ideas of others.

By 1909 he had decided to move on from local politics to central government and was the Member of Parliament for Auckland at the time the park was proposed as part of Mayor Parr's City Beautification scheme. In 1913 he gave the City £9,000 to purchase the required land.

Following Myer's intentions, the 2.4ha² of the wasteland was transformed into an example of a Reform Park designed by the City Park Superintendent Thomas Pearson, who had previously been employed by the New Zealand government to create the gardens at Rotorua, Te Aroha, Queenstown and Hamner Springs.

The 'Reform Park' movement was a newly developed concept in the United States where rampant urban growth was raising many concerns and resulting in the systematic provision of safe spaces for children to play and green spaces to relax in.

At this time many cities were trying to improve their civic landscape with Artistic Parks and Sports Grounds - in Auckland Albert Park 1884 is an example of the former and Victoria Park 1905 an example of the latter.

The concept of a Reform Park is halfway between these two extremes - a place of quiet reflection being unencumbered by either elevated artworks or noisy sports facilities. Myers Park was intended as a place where parents and small children could engage with nature in a relaxed setting devoid of artificial creations and activities like statues or sports.

The park was named for its benefactor Arthur Myers and opened by Mayor Christopher Parr on Tuesday January the 28th 1915.

Following the example of the department store owner John Court who had fitted out Victoria Park with playground equipment in 1912, Arthur Myers paid for the playground equipment and arranged for it to be imported from the US. The centrepiece of the park is the Kindergarten Building, which Myers also paid for in a further donation to the city. This was probably influenced by the example of another benefactor; Sir John Logan Campbell who had paid for a similar facility to be provided for Victoria Park.

The official opening of Myers Park by Mayor Christopher Parr was on 28 January 1915. The New Zealand Herald from 29 January 1915 reported that a large crowd turned up for the opening including hundreds of children. This must have pleased Arthur Myers as the park was focused on children with the plans for the kindergarten and playground.

Myers concluded his remarks that day by saying, "I trust this park will be a source of joy to the citizens of Auckland, present and future. It is the people's property, may they treasure it as their own, seek enjoyment and recreation within its boundaries, and make it an agency for the promotion of the public good."

Of late, the park has attracted a certain degree of notoriety due to a spate of unsavory incidents. A number of campaigns  have begun to raise the profile and safety of the park with the intention that it recaptures its original charm and once again becomes a place for friends, families, and visitors to enjoy.

Myers Kindergarten Building

In 1915 Myers also donated £4,000 to construct the Myers Free Kindergarten Building. The resulting structure by Chilwell & Trevithick is a prominent example of Arts and Crafts architecture in Auckland.

Myers' brother Leopold (chair of the Auckland Electric Tram Company) had married an American woman, Martha Washington Shainwald, who had been involved in the kindergarten movement in San Francisco. She and Arthur Myers carefully oversaw the creation of the Kindergarten Building and specified certain details such as curved interior corners for safety and sanitary tilework for hygiene. The building was opened by the Governor General Lord Liverpool on 15 November 1916.

The Kindergarten was intended as a philanthropic gift to benefit the mostly poor families of the area. The ground floor was operated as a free Kindergarten while the first floor was a School for Backward Children. While the free Kindergarten no longer exists the facility is run as a Playcare Centre (KiNZ in the Park). The upper floor is now occupied by the Auckland Kindergarten Association. The building together with parts of the park itself, on the register of Heritage New Zealand.

Other features
Randalls:
The park also contains the caretaker's cottage, one of only two kauri buildings on Queen Street that are more than 100 years old. This house probably dates from the 1850s and was called "Randalls" presumably derived from a house mentioned in Jane Austen's  novel Emma.

It was retained when the park created between 1913 and 1916 and modified to harmonise with the adjacent Kindergarten Building. For most of the 20th century it was occupied by Council staff but was rented out to private tenants after the 1980s. From the late 1990s it was left empty and began to deteriorate. The interior suffered two minor fires in 2005 and the dilapidated building has been boarded up since then, being regarded as an eyesore.

Despite various announcements from Auckland City Council and its successor Auckland Council over a decade nothing has been done to stabilise, renovate or restore the building. As part of the 2015 Centenary Celebrations the Karangahape Road Business Association paid for a Centennial mural to be painted on the main facade.
 
Moses:
In 1971 the Milne & Choyce Department Store offered the city a pair of marble statues which had been imported as part of their Centenary Celebrations. Both were full scale copies in marble of the work of Michelangelo Buonarroti 1475–1564, being his famous David and Moses. The City declined the Statue of David but in 1973 installed the Moses at the base of the stairs leading to St Kevins Arcade. This marble statue is made of stone from the same quarry as the original.

Five Goats:
In 1999 Auckland's sister city Guangzhou presented the city with a granite statuary group of Five Goats. Guangzhou [Canton] is known as the Five Goats City. Most Chinese immigrants to New Zealand before 1949 came from the area around Guangzhou. The Guangzhou group recalls the Interwar period when the adjacent Greys Avenue was the home to many Chinese people, although it does not specifically commemorate this connection. The statue is a reduced version of the granite group erected in 1959 in Yiexiu Park in central Guangzhou.

Hau te Kapaka: "The Flapping Wind"
In 2011 the first two of three bronze items by the sculptor Rachel Walters were installed at the Queen Street entrance to the park; Hau te Kapaka "The Flapping Wind" which comment on the effects of pollution and human activity on the natural world and wildlife. The three bronze sculptures portray native shore birds which would have foraged up the Horotui Stream in pre-European times. The third statue was installed in 2013.

2015 Centenary Celebrations
Auckland Council celebrated the centenary of the Park with a Festival on Sunday 15 February 2015. This included entertainments and civic speeches including one by Sir Douglas Myers, the grandson of Arthur Myers. The playground had been remodelled the previous year and new landscaping undertaken including a certain amount of tree trimming.

References

External links
Photographs of Myers Park held in Auckland Libraries' heritage collections.

Urban public parks
Parks in Auckland
Auckland CBD